The women's 200 metres competition at the 1998 Asian Games in Bangkok, Thailand was held on 17–18 December at the Thammasat Stadium.

Schedule
All times are Indochina Time (UTC+07:00)

Results

Heats
 Qualification: First 3 in each heat (Q) and the next 2 fastest (q) advance to the final.

Heat 1 
 Wind: +1.2 m/s

Heat 2 
 Wind: +1.9 m/s

Final
 Wind: +0.1 m/s

References

External links
Results

Women's 00200 metres
1998